Colin Frank Slater (12 April 1934 – 17 May 2000) was  a former Australian rules footballer who played with Richmond in the Victorian Football League (VFL).	

Slater played at Ringwood for three years in the Eastern Suburban Football League, then onto Richmond in 1953.

Slater won the Richmond reserves best and fairest in 195

Slater was captain-coach of Redcliffe in the Sunraysia Football League from 1957 to 1961, coaching them to a flag in 1959 and runners up in 1960.

Slater then coached Tatura in the Goulburn Valley Football League in 1961 and 1962, before taking on the captain-coach role at Mangoplah in 1963.

Notes

External links 
		

Frank Slater Profile at Tigerland Archive

1934 births
2000 deaths
Australian rules footballers from Victoria (Australia)
Richmond Football Club players